WCAR (1090 AM) is a commercial radio station licensed to Livonia, Michigan, and serving the Metro Detroit radio market. It airs a Spanish language format as a simulcast of WSDS in Salem Township and is owned by the Birach Broadcasting Corporation.

Because AM 1090 is a clear channel frequency reserved for Class A stations in Little Rock, Baltimore, and Tijuana, Mexico, WCAR must broadcast at a lower power and with a directional antenna to avoid interference. By day, it transmits 250 watts and at night its power increases to 500 watts.

History
For the history of the radio station formerly known as WCAR 1130 AM from 1939 to 1978, see WDFN.

Early years
On May 23, 1961, the station first sign-on as WERB in Garden City, Michigan. It was co-owned with the now-defunct WBRB in Mount Clemens and aired a full service/middle of the road format aimed at the western suburbs of Wayne County. The original owner was Milton Maltz, the founder of the Malrite Communications Group (now Raycom Media). WERB started as a daytimer, required to go off the air at sunset to avoid interfering with other stations on AM 1090. In the 1964-1965 time frame, Gil Wuttke was the WERB radio station Chief Engineer and late afternoon/evening DJ, playing easy listening music.

Around 1966, WERB became WTAK, still under Malrite's ownership. WTAK was notable for being the Detroit area's first all-talk radio station. (The WTAK call sign referred to TALK.) The air staff included such Detroit radio notables as Tom Clay, Vic Caputo, and Paul Winter. 

Following a sale to Wolpin Broadcasting in 1969, WTAK changed to WIID ("wide") in January 1970 and went back to a suburban-oriented MOR format. It switched to Latin music programming by the mid 1970s. For years afterward, the bulk of AM 1090's programming, as WIID and later (starting in 1979) WCAR, consisted of paid brokered programming, in foreign languages and some English-language talk.

Children's radio
During the mid-1990s, WCAR 1090 was also briefly the Detroit network affiliate station for Radio AAHS, a now-defunct nationwide radio network featuring programming for children. Then, after Radio AAHS shut down in 1998, it aired the Minneapolis-based dance music format "Beat Radio" which replaced AAHS on all ten of the company-owned former AAHS stations around the country.

In the late 1990s, much of WCAR's programming had been simulcast on sister station WOAP 1080 AM in Owosso, focused on the Lansing radio market. The two stations aired ethnic brokered programming, along with religious content from Michigan Catholic Radio. (WOAP now airs an adult hits format.)

Talk format
In May 2009, WCAR and WOAP were sold to Birach Broadcasting. Michigan Catholic Radio ended its broadcasts on WCAR on July 31, 2009 when Birach took over the station. Beginning in 2009, the station aired a syndicated talk format with Imus in the Morning, Brian Kilmeade, Robert Wuhl, Jim Bohannon and Red Eye Radio, using newscasts from CNN, Fox News Radio and MarketWatch.

A new afternoon drive time show featuring local legendary broadcasters Bill Bonds & Rich Fisher (Bonds & Fisher) debuted on October 3, 2011. The show was cancelled in late December 2011. The station considered retooling the talk format, but management decided to go in a different direction.

All sports
On February 1, 2012, WCAR switched from a talk format to all-sports, featuring ESPN Radio programming. The change was mentioned by Mike Tirico during the Illinois-Michigan State basketball game on January 31, 2012, on ESPN. The flip signified the return of ESPN Radio to the Detroit market for the first time since 2007.

WCAR began locally produced sports talk programming in April 2012 with a one-hour Detroit Red Wings playoff show. That expanded into a daily afternoon drive time program with more local shows being added until the station was running local programming from 1 p.m. to 10 p.m. on most weekdays.

The locally produced programming abruptly ended on May 3, 2013, and WCAR switched over to 100% syndicated programming.

At 10 p.m. on July 12, 2013, ESPN Radio pulled its programming off WCAR ending its relationship with the station, with the ESPN affiliation going to WMGC-FM as that station switched to a sports format. WCAR picked up NBC Sports Radio in its place. WCAR began using 100% of NBC Sports Radio's national programming with no local programming announced.

WCAR is directly competing with WXYT, WXYT-FM, and WDFN as the four sports stations in Detroit. WMGC-FM was a competitor until June 2016, when it dropped the format due to low ratings. On May 9, 2014, WCAR announced it was switching from NBC Sports Radio to Yahoo! Sports Radio, effective May 12. Yahoo! was renamed "SB Nation Radio" in 2016.

On May 7, 2018, the format flipped again, this time to hip hop and R&B music, as "The Switch." This format was short-lived, as WCAR returned to all-sports in early June 2018, again carrying SB Nation Radio.

The station affiliated with Fox Sports Radio November 2020.

WCAR is currently simulcasting WSDS.

Former logos

See also
 Media in Detroit

References

External links

Michigan Catholic Radio - Programming Guide

CAR
Radio stations established in 1963
1963 establishments in Michigan
Birach Broadcasting Corporation stations
Spanish-language radio stations in the United States